Amerila curta is a moth of the subfamily Arctiinae. It was described by Walter Rothschild in 1917. It is found on the Umboi Islands of Papua New Guinea.

References

Moths described in 1917
Amerilini
Moths of New Guinea